National Telecommuting Institute, Inc. (NTI) is a 501(c)(3) non-profit organization. NTI is headquartered in Boston.

Since the inception of NTI, the non-profit has expanded into three divisions:
NTI@Home, LandAjob, and The Staffing Connection.

The Medical Transcription (MT) division was disbanded at the end of 2014.

The primary roles NTI fulfills include Call Centers, Sales, Customer Service, Tier I and Tier II Help Desk roles. In addition, NTI has provided third party services to staffing agencies to help with their 508 needs. NTI supplies call center technology in addition to personnel.

History
On June 23, 1995, NTI was started by the three founders, Dr. Paul Corcoran, Chairman of the Rehabilitation Department at the Tufts New England Medical Center; Dr. Mark Schlesinger, Chairman of Health Economics Department at Yale; and Dr. M.J. Willard, Behavioral Psychologist who had spent the prior 15 years working with individuals with severe physical disabilities function within their home environment.

Prior to NTI, Willard had spent three years as a research assistant to famed psychologist B.F. Skinner and concluded that his behavior modification methods could be used to train monkeys to help the disabled. Willard then focused her efforts on a non-profit called Helping Hands: Simian Aides for the Disabled which was started in 1977. She spearheaded the concept of using moneys to assist quadriplegics in daily tasks.

Funding
NTI receives its primary funding from participating state vocational rehabilitation agencies, competitive grant programs, charitable donations, and the Social Security Administration's Ticket to Work program as a participating Employment Network. Organizations and programs that have generously provided grants and donations to NTI include The AT&T Foundation, the Charles Stewart Mott Foundation, The Fidelity Foundation, the Robert Wood Johnson Foundation, the U.S. Department of Education: RSA Project With Industries, and the U.S. Department of Labor: Office of Disability Employment Policy.

Employment Fields
Initially, the fields such as indexing, medical billing, legal and medical transcription, proofreading, and appointment reminder services were amenable to telecommuting. However, over the past 14 years most of these positions have faded away due to the evolution of cloud based services and technology such as Dragon Dictate that have revolutionized transcription. Now, the greatest opportunity to employ individuals with disabilities in at home positions exists within the fields of Customer Service, Sales, and Technology Services; such as Tier I and Tier II support.  Customer Service Representatives (CSRs) handling the inbound customer service calls within over 30,000 call centers throughout the country.

Over 90% of NTI's work-at-home placements within the past three years have been within call centers and help desks.  Previous NTI work-at-home agents with disabilities have been hired by employers including the IRS, Ticket Master, and AAA Roadside Assistance.

In 2004, NTI was awarded a JWOD contract with the Internal Revenue Service, placing hundreds of employees for tax forms assistance.

Vocational Rehabilitation Systems
The 70-year-old federal/state vocational rehabilitation (VR) system is the largest network providing help to the 1.2 million disabled Americans who request government assistance in finding work each year. Collectively, state VR agencies operate with a budget of $2.8 billion. The VR agencies have staff and a charter to develop home-based opportunities, but relatively few alternatives to offer their clients within their immediate communities.

State agencies often use some of their funds to purchase services from non-profit organizations such as NTI when their clients in the disability community require specialized assistance. NTI works through VR agencies in approaching low-income members of the disability community who can become home-based teleworkers to meet the growing demand from companies needing CSRs. As of 2009, NTI has standing agreements with 47 state VR agencies.

References

External links

 Official website

Non-profit organizations based in Boston
Companies based in Boston
Disability organizations based in the United States
1995 establishments in Massachusetts
501(c)(3) organizations